The Webb County - City of Laredo Regional Mobility Authority aka Webb County - Laredo RMA in Texas, USA, does not currently operate any roads, but in the future will operate toll roads located inside Webb County.

History
The  Webb County - Laredo RMA was inaugurated on February 27, 2014.

Roadway System
The Authority has a series of road projects:
 Loop 20/US 59/I-69W : Upgrade to an urban interstate expressway
 Vallecillo Road : construct new roadway
 Hatchar Parkway : construct new roadway
 Loop 20/Cuatro Vientos Roadway : add 4 interchanges
 US 59/I-69W upgrade : Laredo City limits to Duval County Line
 Laredo Outer Loop : Relief route corridor from Toll 255 to Rio Bravo/El Cenizo/Future International Bridge V

See also

References

External links
 Regional Mobility Authority approved for Webb County
 WEBB COUNTY - CITY OF LAREDO REGIONAL MOBILITY AUTHORITY

Transportation in Laredo, Texas
Transportation in Webb County, Texas
Regional mobility authority